Clifton is a rural community in the Canadian province of Nova Scotia, located in  Colchester County .

References
 Clifton on Destination Nova Scotia

Communities in Colchester County